Orangeburg City Cemetery is a historic African-American cemetery located at Orangeburg, Orangeburg County, South Carolina. It was established in 1889 and is a five-acre tract containing approximately 300 to 350 burial plots.  Most burials date from about 1890 to the 1960s.

It was added to the National Register of Historic Places in 1996.

Notable burials
 Johnson C. Whittaker (1858–1931), West Point cadet who was expelled, exonerated, and posthumusly awarded a US Army officer commission

References

External links
 

African-American history of South Carolina
Cemeteries on the National Register of Historic Places in South Carolina
1889 establishments in South Carolina
Buildings and structures in Orangeburg County, South Carolina
National Register of Historic Places in Orangeburg County, South Carolina
African-American cemeteries